The Learned Council was a political group of clerics in the 3rd Parliament, led by Hassan Modarres.

According to Touraj Daryaee, it did not consider itself a party and was a group of "hardline rightists particularly opposed to the Democrats". The group opposed the policy of centralization advocated by the government, secularization of penal code, property tax, conscription and women's suffrage.

References 

Political parties established in 1914
Political parties in Qajar Iran
Conservative parties in Iran
Islamic political parties in Iran
Political parties disestablished in 1915
Iranian clerical political groups
Iranian Parliament fractions